Sydney Hall  (30 March 1879 – 29 June 1946) was an Australian rules footballer who played with Essendon in the Victorian Football League (VFL).

Hall, who Essendon acquired from Preston, appeared in eight of the first nine rounds in the 1902 VFL season.

References

1879 births
Australian rules footballers from Victoria (Australia)
Essendon Football Club players
Preston Football Club (VFA) players
1946 deaths